Pushkino may refer to:
Pushkino, Armenia, an inhabited locality in Armenia
Pushkino Urban Settlement, a municipal formation which the City of Pushkino in Pushkinsky District of Moscow Oblast, Russia is incorporated as
Pushkino, Russia, several inhabited localities in Russia
Pushkino, former name of the city of Biləsuvar in Azerbaijan

See also
Pushkin (disambiguation)
Pushkinsky (disambiguation)